USS G-1 (SS-19½) was the lead ship of her class of submarine of the United States Navy. While the four G-boats were nominally all of a class, they differed enough in significant details that they are sometimes considered to be four unique boats, each in a class by herself.

Construction history
G-1 was named Seal when her keel was laid down on 2 February 1909 by the Newport News Shipbuilding Company in Newport News, Virginia, under a subcontract from the Lake Torpedo Boat Company, making her the first ship of the United States Navy to be named for the seal, a sea mammal valued for its skin and oil. She was launched on 8 February 1911, sponsored by Miss Margaret V. Lake, daughter of Simon Lake, the submarine pioneer. She was renamed G-1 on 17 November 1911, and commissioned in the New York Navy Yard on 28 October 1912 with Lieutenant Kenneth Whiting in command.

Seal was the first contract the Lake Torpedo Boat Company secured from the United States Government, but the contract's requirements were among the most severe ever required of a shipbuilder. The Company did not receive any payment on account during her construction and her required performances had never been approached by any other submarine in the world. G-1 met and exceeded those requirements and introduced several innovations. In addition to a pair of fixed torpedo tubes in the bow that required the vessel herself to be trained, G-1 carried four torpedo tubes in a mount on her deck that could be trained in the same manner as a deck gun on a surface vessel while the boat was submerged, thus allowing a "broadside" shot of one or more torpedoes.

Service history
After fitting out in New York City, G-1 proceeded to the Naval Torpedo Station, Rhode Island, arriving there on 30 January 1913. Attached to the Atlantic Submarine Flotilla, G-1 spent the next year and a half conducting dive training and torpedo firing exercises in Long Island Sound and Narragansett Bay. Financial considerations led to G-1 being put in reserve at New York City on 15 June 1914.

G-1 was placed in full commission at New York City on 6 February 1915 with Lieutenant, junior grade Joseph M. Deem in command. In company with sister ship , tender  and tug , G-1 sailed south on 25 March into Chesapeake Bay and down the seaboard for Norfolk, Virginia. Arriving there two days later, she conducted maneuvers in Hampton Roads as part of the Third Division, Submarine Flotilla, Atlantic Fleet. On 2 April, while off Old Point Comfort, G-1 grazed steam ship Ocean View, wrecking the submersible's wooden false bow.

After a short period at Norfolk for repairs, the division cruised south to Charleston, South Carolina, mooring there on 17 April. Heavy seas encountered during this coastwise passage caused the two G-class submarines to roll heavily, spring oil leaks, and pop engine rivets. Following a three-week yard period in Charleston, the two boats – accompanied by Fulton and gunboat  – proceeded back to New York City on 6 May, arriving there three days later.

Upon arrival, retired Rear Admiral Yates Stirling, Jr., senior aide on the staff of Commander, Submarine Flotilla, Atlantic Fleet, inspected the boat and concluded the G-boats were crude and inefficient in comparison to current designs. Deeming their military value negligible, he urged that a field of scientific or experimental use be found for them.

Training ship

G-1 departed New York on 23 May 1915 and proceeded to Newport, Rhode Island, where she became a school ship on the torpedo range. She also carried out harbor defense and patrol battle problems in Narragansett Bay. Aside from minor repairs at New York in June, this duty continued until 3 October, when she set course – along with tender  – for a training cruise to Chesapeake Bay. After making a few days of practice attack runs against the monitor off Fisherman's Island, the boat returned to Newport on 12 October for inspection and crew changes; a week later, she shifted to Naval Submarine Base New London, the new submarine base at New London, Connecticut.

On 4 December, while the crew of G-1 was charging batteries, a circulating pump broke down and severely overheated the port engine. That mishap – combined with a steering gear overhaul at New York – kept ship's force busy in the yard for the next thirteen months. While there, G-1 was assigned (SS-19½) as her official hull number on 12 June 1916. Finally, after a few days of familiarization training, the crew sailed the boat to New London on 23 January 1917.

Once there, G-1 began her new career as an experimental and instructional submersible. She acted as a schoolship for the newly established Submarine Base and Submarine School at New London, training officers and men of the newly expanded submarine force. Concurrently, given the entry of the United States into World War I, G-1 tested submarine nets and detector devices for the Experiment Board. She served in a similar capacity at Nahant, Massachusetts, and Provincetown, Massachusetts, assisting the destroyer  and steam yacht  in the development and use of sound detection devices and experiments with the "K tube," a communications device. With German U-boats reported off the coast in June 1918, the submarine spent two four-day periscope and listening patrols off Nantucket, Massachusetts, as a defense screen for shipping.

Following the end of the war, G-1 conducted daily operations with enlisted students in connection with the Listener and Hydrophone School at New London. In August 1919, after a failed inspection by the Board of Inspection and Survey, the boat was laid up at New London in preparation for disposal. Towed to the Philadelphia Navy Yard on 30 January 1920 she was stripped of useful material and decommissioned on 6 March. She was designated as a target for depth charge experiments under the cognizance of the Bureau of Ordnance on 9 June.

F-1 had sunk in a collision with F-3 in 1917, so there was no overlap in time of service.

Target ship
The minesweeper  towed G-1 back to Narragansett Bay in May 1921. Grebe made eight experimental depth charge attacks on G-1 while the boat lay off Taylor's Point on 21 June. Several attempts to raise her failed and her wreck was officially abandoned. G-1 was struck from the Naval Vessel Register on 29 August 1921.

References

External links
 

United States G-class submarines
World War I submarines of the United States
Shipwrecks of the Rhode Island coast
Ships sunk as targets
Maritime incidents in 1921
1911 ships
Ships built in Newport News, Virginia